Plagodis kuetzingi, the purple plagodis, is a North American moth in the family Geometridae.  It is an uncommon to rare moth.

Distribution
This moth is found from Nova Scotia south to Virginia and Tennessee west to Illinois, Iowa, and Wisconsin.

Flight
The purple plagodis is found from May to July.

Host plants
It feeds only on ash trees (Fraxinus sp.)

References

Moths of North America
Ourapterygini